Euthymius the Athonite ( Ekvtime Atoneli;  955–1024) was a Georgian monk, philosopher and scholar, who is venerated as a saint. His feast day in the Orthodox Church is May 13.

Euthymius was a Georgian, the ethnonym used by the Byzantines as Iberian, that came from the Kingdom of the Iberians. The son of John the Iberian and nephew of the Tornike Eristavi, Euthymius was taken as a political hostage to Constantinople but was later released and became a monk joining the Great Lavra of Athanasios on Mount Athos. He subsequently became the leader of the Georgian Iviron monastery, which had been founded by his father, and emerged as one of the finest Eastern Christian theologians and scholars of his age. Euthymius labored as abbot of the Iviron Monastery on Mt. Athos for fourteen years before stepping aside to concentrate on his translations.

Fluent in Georgian, Greek and other languages, he translated many religious treatises and philosophical works. Among his major works was the translation of sibrdzne balavarisa (Wisdom of Balahvari), which some believe to be a Christianized version of episodes from the life of Gautama Buddha that became very popular in Medieval Europe as the story of Barlaam and Josaphat. Of equal importance was Euthymius’ work to prepare Georgian translations of various Greek philosophical, ecclesiastical and legal discourses.

He died near Byzantium, when a mule on which he was riding, startled by the approach of a beggar made to bolt and Euthymius fell. His relics are buried in the Church of Saint John the Baptist at the Iveron Monastery on Mt. Athos.

References

Sources
 Theodor Dowling, Sketches of Georgian Church History, Adamant Media Corporation (October 9, 2003), 
  

11th-century people from Georgia (country)
10th-century people from Georgia (country)
11th-century Byzantine monks
11th-century Christian saints
10th-century Byzantine monks
Calligraphers from Georgia (country)
Athonite Fathers
Nobility of Georgia (country)
Saints of Georgia (country)
Philosophers from Georgia (country)
Eastern Orthodox theologians
Translators from Greek
Translators to Georgian
Byzantine people of Georgian descent
950s births
1020s deaths
11th-century philosophers
People associated with Great Lavra
People associated with Iviron Monastery